Crossodactylus schmidti is a species of frog in the family Hylodidae.
It is found in Argentina, Brazil, and Paraguay.
Its natural habitats are subtropical or tropical moist lowland forest and rivers.
It is threatened by habitat loss.

It is named after Karl Patterson Schmidt, American herpetologist.

References

Crossodactylus
Amphibians of Argentina
Amphibians of Brazil
Amphibians of Paraguay
Taxonomy articles created by Polbot
Amphibians described in 1961